Berimvand and Berimownd or Barimvand may refer to:
 Berimvand, Miyan Darband, Kermanshah County
 Berimvand, Qarah Su, Kermanshah County
 Berimvand, Sarpol-e Zahab